Julius Binder (12 May 1870 in Würzburg – 28 August 1939 in Göttingen) was a German philosopher of law. He is principally known as an opponent of legal positivism, and for having remained as an active scholar during the 1930s in Nazi Germany who did not speak out against the prevailing government of that time.

Life 
After studying law in Würzburg with honors (1894) and Habilitation (1898), he became professor in Rostock (1900), Erlangen (1903), Würzburg (1913) and Göttingen (1919). He founded the "International Hegel Federal" and became a member of the Göttingen Academy of Sciences.

After he had applied in earlier works the concept of rights from Immanuel Kant (as in: "Legal concept and idea of law" from the year 1915), he later became a strong critic of Neokantian legal philosophy, especially the philosophy of law of Rudolf Stammler. Since the 1920s, Julius Binder—and later along with Karl Larenz, Gerhard Dulckeit and Walther Schönfeld –- he applied a Neohegelian approach to jurisprudence in the system of the so-called "objective idealism". Binder was the academic teacher of the German legal philosopher and civil law proponent Karl Larenz. He rejected legal positivism.

In addition, Binder, along with others such as Ernst Forsthoff, Carl Schmitt, Karl Larenz among legal philosophers, did not criticize the Nazi legal system.

Since 1890 he was a member of the Corps Bavaria Würzburg.

Literary works 
 Das Problem der Juristischen Persönlichkeit (1907)
 Rechtsbegriff und Rechtsidee, 1915
 Philosophie der Rechts, 1925
 Grundlegung zur Rechtsphilosophie, 1935
 System der Rechtsphilosophie, 1937

References

External links
 

1870 births
1939 deaths
19th-century German people
20th-century German people
Philosophers of law
19th-century German philosophers
20th-century German philosophers
19th-century German jurists
20th-century German jurists
Hegelian philosophers
Academic staff of the University of Göttingen
People of Nazi Germany
Writers from Würzburg
Members of the Göttingen Academy of Sciences and Humanities